Leptotrophon kastoroae is a species of sea snail, a marine gastropod mollusk in the family Muricidae, the murex snails or rock snails.

Description
The length of the shell attains 11.2 mm.

Distribution
This marine species occurs off Indonesia.

References

 Houart, R. (1997). Mollusca, Gastropoda: The Muricidae collected during the KARUBAR Cruise in eastern Indonesia. in: Crosnier, A. et al. (Ed.) Résultats des Campagnes MUSORSTOM 16. Campagne Franco-Indonésienne KARUBAR. Mémoires du Muséum national d'Histoire naturelle. Série A, Zoologie. 172: 287–294

External links
 MNHN, Paris: holotype

Muricidae
Gastropods described in 1997